2012 Malta Open is a darts tournament, which took place in Buġibba, Malta in 2012.

Results

References

2012 in darts
2012 in Maltese sport
Darts in Malta
St. Paul's Bay